Zhenbao Island or Damansky Island (ostrov Damanskiy) is an island with an area of only . It is on the Ussuri River on the border between Primorsky Krai, Russia, and Heilongjiang Province, China.

Prior to the 1991 Sino-Soviet Border Agreement, the island was disputed between China and the Soviet Union. It got its Russian name from the railway engineer Stanislav Damansky, who died there in an incident in 1888 while he was charting the future route for the Trans-Siberian railway.

Conflict between Soviet Union and China 

The island was the subject of a territorial dispute between the Soviet Union and China. Battles were fought with a considerable loss of life during the Sino-Soviet border conflict in March 1969. The dispute over Zhenbao raised concerns that it could ignite World War III until an initial resolution of the conflict in November 1969.

On 19 May 1991, both sides came to an agreement that the island was part of the territory of China, and the Soviet troops withdrew.

A 2004 Russian documentary film, Damansky Island Year 1969. ("Остров Даманский. 1969 год"), was made about the 1969 Zhenbao incident.

References

External links
Centuries-old dispute became open combat during Cold War (archived webpage)
Geo Coords: 46°29'8.13"N, 133°50'40.04"E. Google Earth File
Google Maps satellite image
Google Earth BBS article
Damanski-Zhenbao website

Islands of Heilongjiang
Territorial disputes of China
China–Russia border
River islands of China
Ramsar sites in China